The Yurka class were a group of minesweepers built for the Soviet Navy and export customers between 1963 and 1970. The Soviet designation was Project 266 Rubin.

Design

A new ocean minesweeper design was requested in 1957 to follow the T43 class minesweeper into the Soviet Navy. The design was approved in 1959 and entered service in 1963. Major improvements in mine detection and anti mine explosion protection were implemented. Magnetic, acoustic and electric signatures were reduced. The hull was built of low magnetic steel.

Ships

Soviet Navy

About 41 ships were built for the Soviet Navy, One ship was lost to an accidental explosion in the Black Sea in 1989. All the Ships were decommissioned by the mid-1990s

Egyptian Navy

Fours ships transferred in 1969 - in service 2008

Vietnam Navy

Two ships transferred in 1979 - in service 2008

See also
List of ships of the Soviet Navy
List of ships of Russia by project number

References

 Also published as 
  All Yurka Class Minesweepers - Complete Ship List

Mine warfare vessel classes
Minesweepers of the Soviet Navy
 
Minesweepers of the Egyptian Navy
Minesweepers of the Vietnam People's Navy